The Connecticut Turnpike (officially the Governor John Davis Lodge Turnpike) is a controlled-access highway and former toll road in the U.S. state of Connecticut; it is maintained by the Connecticut Department of Transportation (ConnDOT). The turnpike briefly runs concurrently with US 1 from Old Saybrook to Old Lyme and Route 2A from Montville to Norwich.

Construction on the Connecticut Turnpike began in 1954 and the highway was opened in 1958. It originally followed a sequential exit numbering system that disregarded route transition, where the exit numbers on I-395 were a continuation of the exit numbers on I-95. In 2015, the I-395 exit numbers were changed to a mileage-based system reflecting their distance from the split from I-95, effectively removing the defining element of the turnpike. In some sections southwest of New Haven, it carries an annual average daily traffic of over 150,000 vehicles.

Route description

I-95

I-95 enters Connecticut as the Connecticut Turnpike in Greenwich at the New York state line. This portion of the highway passes through the most heavily urbanized section of Connecticut along the shoreline between Greenwich and New Haven, going through the cities of Stamford, Norwalk, Bridgeport, and New Haven, with daily traffic volumes of 120,000 to over 150,000 throughout the entire  length between the New York border and the junction with I-91 in New Haven. The turnpike intersects with several major expressways, namely US 7 at exit 15 in Norwalk, Route 8 at exit 27A in Bridgeport, the Merritt and Wilbur Cross parkways at exit 38 (via the Milford Parkway) in Milford, and I-91 at exit 48 in New Haven.

North (east) of I-91, the turnpike continues along the Connecticut shoreline, usually with less traffic. The six-lane highway is reduced to four lanes in Branford, interchanges with Route 9 at exit 69 in Old Saybrook, crosses the Connecticut River on the Raymond E. Baldwin Bridge and continues until the interchange with I-395 at exit 76 near the East Lyme–Waterford line.

I-395
The turnpike leaves I-95 at exit 76 in East Lyme, continuing on as I-395 north heading towards Norwich, Jewett City and Plainfield until exit 35, where the turnpike and I-395 split. I-395 continues north towards Worcester, Massachusetts, ending at I-290 and the Massachusetts Turnpike. The Connecticut Turnpike officially ends at US 6 (Danielson Pike) in Killingly, which continues on towards Providence, Rhode Island. Unlike the I-95 portion, the I-395 portion of the turnpike has changed very little over the years, retaining its grass median with a guardrail separating directions of travel.

US 1
The Connecticut Turnpike incorporated a pre-existing relocation of US 1 between Old Saybrook and Old Lyme, which included the original Raymond E. Baldwin Bridge over the Connecticut River, which opened in 1948. Upon the turnpike's opening in 1958, US 1 has been co-signed with the turnpike between exit 68 in Old Saybrook and exit 70 in Old Lyme.

Route 2A
Route 2A was constructed to serve as a bypass around Norwich. It shares its alignment with the Connecticut Turnpike from its northern terminus at Route 2 to exit 9 on I-395, where it turns east and serves the Mohegan Sun Casino before crossing the Thames River and ending at Route 2 south of Norwich.

SR 695
SR 695 is the  unsigned portion of the turnpike from I-395 in Plainfield to US 6 at the Rhode Island state line in Killingly. The road is not signed as SR 695 but eastbound as "To US 6 East" and westbound as "To I-395 South". SR 695 would have become part of the now-defunct alignment of the I-84 freeway between Hartford, Connecticut, and Providence, Rhode Island, had that freeway been built. (Present-day I-84 continues eastbound from Hartford into Massachusetts where it ends at I-90, the Massachusetts Turnpike). There are two partial exits on SR 695. Westbound exit 1 (formerly exit 90) at Squaw Rock Road is only accessible westbound. The intersection with I-395 is only partial: there is no access provided from SR 695 westbound to I-395 northbound and no access from I-395 southbound to SR 695 eastbound.

History
The general route and construction of the turnpike were both mandated by state law. Intended to relieve congestion on US 1 and Route 15 (the Merritt and Wilbur Cross parkways), design work began in 1954. The Connecticut Turnpike opened to traffic on January 2, 1958 at 2:30 p.m. However, the westernmost portion of the highway (the  connecting Greenwich with the New England Thruway) opened 10 months later. Tolls were originally collected through a series of eight toll booths along the route.

The Connecticut Turnpike was designed and built much differently than other toll roads built around the same time. Unlike toll roads in other states that operated under semi-autonomous, quasi-public toll road authorities, the Connecticut Turnpike was operated by the Connecticut Highway Department (later the Connecticut Department of Transportation) from its inception. Additionally, unlike toll roads in other states where revenues collected from motorists were legally required to be kept within the toll road authority and used to finance the facility's construction and upkeep, toll revenues from the Connecticut Turnpike were placed into the state's general fund and used for highway and non-highway expenditures alike. Finally, the closely spaced interchanges and eight mainline barriers were a result of each town through which the Connecticut Turnpike passed being guaranteed a certain number of access points to gain the support of each affected town for construction of the highway. This is in contrast to toll roads built in neighboring states with widely spaced interchanges that normally featured a ticket system where one obtained a ticket at entering the toll road, then paid a distance-based fare upon exiting.

The turnpike was renamed after former Connecticut Governor John Davis Lodge on December 31, 1985, two months after the tolls were removed. Local legend is the initial phase of turnpike construction in 1954 was so disruptive in heavily Republican Fairfield County that local voters there turned on incumbent Republican Governor Lodge, leading to his defeat by Abraham Ribicoff.

Initially, the Connecticut Turnpike was signed as an east–west route, even after the I-95 designation was added to the turnpike between Greenwich and Waterford in the early 1960s. Signs indicating I-95/Connecticut Turnpike as an east–west route existed in places until the early 1990s, when the remaining east–west signage was replaced by north–south signage.

From Waterford to Killingly, the turnpike was initially designated as Route 52 in 1967, following the opening of the toll-free section of Route 52 from Killingly to the Massachusetts border. To accommodate the truncation of the Hartford to Providence extension of I-84 to Killingly, following Rhode Island's cancellation of its portion of that extension in the early 1980s, Route 52 was to be re-designated as an Interstate. Initially, Connecticut and Massachusetts requested that the American Association of State Highway and Transportation Officials (AASHTO) extend the I-290 designation southward along free Route 52 and the Connecticut Turnpike to I-95 in Waterford. AASHTO rejected the I-290 request and instead approved the I-395 designation in 1983.

Accidents
Several notorious accidents have occurred throughout the turnpike's history. The worst of these was a serious incident on January 19, 1983, in which a tractor trailer after a brake failure collided with four cars at the Stratford toll plaza, killing seven people and injuring several others. The investigation following the crash determined that the truck driver fell asleep at the wheel just before the crash took place. At the time, the government of Connecticut was removing tolls along the turnpike; as a result of the incident, the government expedited the removal of the remaining tollbooths.

In June 1983, a section of the turnpike's northbound Mianus River Bridge in Greenwich collapsed due to corrosion of its substructure, killing three motorists crossing it at the time.

On March 25, 2004, a tanker truck carrying fuel swerved to avoid a car that cut the truck off and subsequently overturned, dumping  of home heating oil onto the Howard Avenue overpass in Bridgeport. Passing vehicles kicked up the oil which ignited a towering inferno that subsequently melted the bridge structure and caused the southbound lanes to sag several feet. The northbound lanes, which received less damage from the fire, were opened five days later after being reinforced with temporary scaffolding. The southbound lanes opened on April 1, after a temporary bridge was erected.

Stalling of upgrades by budget deficits and lawsuits

The Connecticut Turnpike opened southwest Connecticut to a mass migration of New Yorkers, leading to substantial residential and economic growth in Fairfield and New Haven counties. The turnpike became a primary commuter route to New York City. With additional segments of I-95 that opened in the 1960s connecting to Providence and Boston, the turnpike became an essential route for transporting people and goods throughout the Northeast. As a result, much of the turnpike had become functionally obsolete by 1965, with traffic exceeding its design capacity. Originally designed to carry 60,000 vehicles per day (VPD) on the four-lane sections and 90,000 VPD on the six-lane portion west of New Haven, the turnpike carried 75,000–100,000 VPD east of New Haven, and 130,000–200,000 VPD between New Haven and the New York state line as of 2006.

There were dozens of plans discussed to alleviate traffic congestion and improve safety on the turnpike for nearly 30 years, but most of these plans languished amid political infighting and lawsuits brought on by special-interest groups. Still, traffic and deadly accidents continued to increase each year on the turnpike, and by the 1990s the Connecticut Turnpike had started to become known as "the Highway of Death".

Furthermore, while most of the turnpike is signed as I-95 or I-395, the highway was designed and built before the Interstate Highway System was established. Interchanges are too closely spaced; ramps and acceleration-deceleration lanes need to be lengthened. In some areas, median and shoulder widths and curve radii also fall short of Interstate standards.

Complicating efforts to upgrade the turnpike to Interstate standards is that engineers did not acquire enough right-of-way to accommodate future expansion when the Connecticut Turnpike was built during the late 1950s, which means adjacent land must be seized to upgrade the turnpike, resulting in lengthy and costly eminent domain battles between the State of Connecticut and landowners refusing to give up their property. Additionally the turnpike passes through areas with some of the highest property values in the country, making land acquisition for expanding the highway extremely expensive. Finally, the turnpike was built through environmentally sensitive ecosystems and wetlands associated with Long Island Sound, meaning most expansion projects require lengthy environmental impact studies that are able to withstand constant litigation by environmental groups. Air pollution laws also cause conflict, since Connecticut is grouped into the federal statistical areas around New York City and it suffers from consequences and special regulations applied to non-compliant air quality areas. An example of this is that it is easier to lengthen an entrance or exit ramp than to add a full lane, since adding any capacity to a road, by definition, will increase the pollution created by the road, further violating federal air quality standards. In 2000, one ConnDOT official commented during a public meeting on expanding I-84 (an Interstate that parallels I-95 about  further inland), "If we had tried to build I-95 today, it would be impossible because of the sensitive ecosystems it passes through. It would never get approved."

Bridge collapse jumpstarts turnpike upgrades
A comprehensive plan to address safety and capacity issues on the Connecticut Turnpike did not progress beyond the initial planning stages until the collapse of the Mianus River Bridge on June 28, 1983. Following the collapse, Governor William A. O'Neill initiated an $8 billion program to rehabilitate Connecticut's highways. Included in this program was the inspection and repair of the turnpike's nearly 300 bridges and overpasses. Furthermore, O'Neill directed ConnDOT to develop a viable plan for addressing safety and congestion on the state's roads.

High-priority status
Throughout the late 1980s and early 1990s, ConnDOT developed a comprehensive plan to improve the turnpike through Fairfield and New Haven counties. In 1993 ConnDOT embarked on a 25-year multibillion-dollar program to upgrade the Connecticut Turnpike from the Connecticut River at Old Saybrook to the New York state line at Greenwich. The program included the complete reconstruction of several turnpike segments, including replacing bridges, adding travel lanes, reconfiguring interchanges, upgrading lighting and signage, and implementing the intelligent transportation system with traffic cameras, a variety of embedded roadway sensors, and variable-message signs. Since the start of the program, a  section through Bridgeport was completely rebuilt to Interstate standards. In 2015, a long-term $2 billion program was completed, to rebuild  of turnpike between West Haven and Branford, including a new extradosed Pearl Harbor Memorial Bridge over the Quinnipiac River and New Haven Harbor.

Plans to upgrade the turnpike received a boost in 2005 when federal legislation known as SAFETEA-LU designated the I-95 portion of the Connecticut Turnpike from the New York state line to Waterford as High Priority Corridor 65. Corridor 65 also includes the  section of I-95 from Waterford to the Rhode Island state line that was built in 1964, which is not part of the Turnpike.

Plans for the I-395/SR 695 section
Traffic is relatively light on the rural I-395 section and the northeast leg (SR 695) in Killingly; this section is largely unchanged from its original 1958 profile. The only two major projects completed on this section since were the 2015 renumbering of exits based on I-395 mileposts (exit 77 became exit 2, up to exit 90 which became exit 35) and the reconstruction of the northbound on and off ramps at exit 11 (old exit 80) in Norwich, completed in 2009.

Improvement projects

 Raymond E. Baldwin Bridge replacement (Connecticut River), Old Saybrook (to Old Lyme):  $460 million, completed in 1994
 Saugatuck River Bridge replacement, Westport: $65 million, completed in 1996
 Lake Saltonstall Bridge Widening, East Haven: $50 million, completed in 1997
 Widening and reconstruction exits 8-10, Stamford: $80 million, completed in 2000
 Reconstruction of exit 40, Milford:  $30 million, completed in 2002
 Reconstruction of exit 41, Orange: $60 million, completed in 2000
 Reconstruction/widening exits 23-30, Bridgeport: $570 million, completed in 2006 (two years behind schedule and $170 million over budget) (NOTE 2)
 Widening between exits 51 to 54, East Haven–Branford: $86 million, completed in 2006
 Reconfigure northbound ramps at exit 80, Norwich: $8 million, started in April 2009, completed in November 2009.
 Widening between exits 51 and 49 (NOTE 1), East Haven–New Haven: $70 million, started in 2005, completed in 2008
 Pearl Harbor Memorial Bridge replacement, New Haven: $490 million, started in 2008, completed in 2015 (NOTE 3)
 I-91/Route 34 interchange reconstruction, New Haven: $270 million, initial phases started in 2004, completed in 2016
 Exit 42 reconstruction, West Haven: $36 million, started in 2003, completed in 2007
 Housatonic River Bridge replacement, Milford–Stratford: $300 million, work started in September 2009, completed in 2016
 West River Bridge replacement and widening (including reconstructing exit 44 and removing exit 45), New Haven: $200 million; construction began in 2014, completed in 2018
 Widening between exits 10 and 13, Darien: $35 million, started in 2008, completed in 2010
 Widening between exits 14 and 15, Norwalk: $50 million, started in 2013, completed in 2015
 Widening and reconstruction between exits 45 and 47 (Long Wharf Section), New Haven: $200–500 million, started in 2009, completed in 2013
 Add a travel lane in each direction from Branford to Waterford:  $1.0 billion
 Reconstruction and widening exits 6-8, Stamford: Cost TBD, expected start TBD, expected completion TBD.
 Add a travel lane in each direction from New York state Line to Bridgeport:  Cost TBD, expected start TBD, expected completion TBD

 Exit 49 was permanently closed in October 2006 as part of this project. Access to Stiles Street is now provided at exit 50 via the newly constructed Waterfront Connector. The southbound on-ramp still exists onto the Pearl Harbor Memorial Bridge.
 The southbound off-ramp and northbound on-ramp for exit 28 were removed in 2000 during reconstruction of the Connecticut Turnpike in Bridgeport.
 Replacement of the Pearl Harbor Memorial Bridge in New Haven was planned to start in 2007. Due to the rising cost of materials however, there were no contractors interested in the project when it was advertised for bid in 2006. ConnDOT broke the project up into several smaller contracts, with construction completed on all contracts by November 2016.

Tolls
Tolls on the Connecticut Turnpike have been a source of controversy from the turnpike's opening in 1958 to the removal of tolls in 1985, and the debate continues today. The Connecticut Turnpike originally opened with a barrier toll system (or open system), unlike toll roads in neighboring states, which used a ticket system (or closed system) for collecting tolls. Initially tolls on the Connecticut Turnpike were $0.25, and the toll barriers were located in the following locations: Greenwich, Norwalk, Stratford, West Haven, Branford, Madison, Montville, and Plainfield. Tolls also were collected until 1969 in Old Saybrook at the west end of the Baldwin Bridge over the Connecticut River. Additionally, unlike other toll roads which featured widely spaced interchanges and generally ran along the outskirts of major urban centers, the Connecticut Turnpike was built through the middle of several large cities (notably Stamford, Bridgeport, and New Haven) and has over 90 interchanges along its  length—50 of which are along the  stretch between the New York state line and New Haven.

Token war with New York City Subway
There was some controversy in the early 1980s when New York City Subway riders discovered that tokens purchased for use in the Connecticut Turnpike toll booths were of the same size and weight as New York City Subway tokens. Since the turnpike tokens cost less than one third as much, they began showing up in subway collection boxes regularly. Connecticut authorities initially agreed to change the size of their tokens, but later reneged and the problem went unsolved until 1985, when Connecticut discontinued tolls on the turnpike. At that time, the MTA was paid 17.5 cents for each of more than two million tokens that had been collected during the three-year "token war".

Abolition of tolls
After the 1983 truck crash at the Stratford toll plaza, toll opponents pressured the State of Connecticut to remove tolls from the turnpike in 1985. Three years later, these same opponents successfully lobbied the Connecticut General Assembly to pass legislation abolishing tolls on all of Connecticut's highways (with the exception of two car ferries across the Connecticut River in Chester and Glastonbury). While the 1983 Stratford accident was cited as the main reason for abolishing tolls in Connecticut, the underlying reason was that federal legislation at that time forbade states with toll roads from using federal funds for road projects. Because the Mianus River Bridge was rebuilt with federal highway funds following its June 1983 collapse, Connecticut was required by Section 113(c) of the Federal Aid Highway Act of 1956 to remove tolls from the turnpike once its construction bonds were paid off.

The debate over tolls on the Connecticut Turnpike did not end in 1988 with the abolition of tolls. Prior to their removal in 1985, the tolls generated over $65 million annually. Since their removal in the late 1980s, Connecticut lawmakers have continuously discussed reinstating tolls, but have balked at bringing tolls back out of concern of having to repay $2.6 billion in federal highway funds that Connecticut received for turnpike construction projects following the abolition of tolls.

During the economic recession of the early 1990s, legislators studied reinstating tolls on parts of the Connecticut Turnpike and portions of highways around Hartford to make up for budget deficits. Proposals for reinstating tolls were scrapped in lieu of implementing an income tax and increasing the state gasoline tax and sales tax, and imposing a new tax on corporate windfall profits.

Continuation of toll debate
With continual budget woes in Hartford, the idea of reinstating tolls resurfaced in January 2010. State Representative Tony Guerrera estimated a $5 toll at Connecticut's borders could generate $600 million in revenue. Governor Dannel P. Malloy expressed pessimism that toll revenue would be spent exclusively on infrastructure repairs, but a need to generate additional revenue, paired with decreases in traditional highway funding sources (such as federal aid and gas tax revenue) means the idea could receive serious consideration in the state legislature.

Services

The turnpike has 13 service plazas, which are open 24 hours a day. All feature a Subway, a Dunkin' Donuts, a convenience store and fuel service provided by ExxonMobil (branded as Mobil). Most plazas also offer a variety of other food service options, including McDonald's and Sbarro. From 2011 to 2015, the original plazas were rebuilt with new and expanded buildings and improved fueling facilities. Prior to the rebuilding, the plazas on the I-395 section only had a convenience store.
 Darien southbound—between exits 10 and 9—food and fuel—rebuilt 2013
 Darien northbound—between exits 12 and 13—food and fuel—Connecticut Welcome Center—Rebuilt 2013. The McDonald's restaurant at this service area claims to be the busiest in the country.
 Fairfield northbound and southbound—between exits 21 and 22—food and fuel—rebuilt 2014
 Milford northbound and southbound—between exits 40 and 41—food and fuel—rebuilt 2011
 Branford northbound and southbound—between exits 53 and 54—food and fuel—rebuilt 2013-14
 Madison northbound and southbound—between exits 60 and 61—food and fuel—NB rebuilt 2014, SB rebuilt 2015
 Montville southbound only—between exits 9 and 6—food and fuel—rebuilt 2013
 Plainfield northbound and southbound—between exits 32 and 35—food and fuel—rebuilt 2012

The former northbound Montville service area has been turned into a State Police barracks.

In addition to the service areas listed above, there is a rest area, with restrooms, picnic area, vending machines, and tourist information, located northbound at milepost 74 between exits 65 and 66. In July 2016, the rest area was closed due to budget cuts and barriers were placed on the highway blocking access to the facility. In September 2019, the rest area was reopened on a seasonal basis, being closed from November until mid May (with no access during that time).

There are three State Police stations located on the turnpike:
Troop F: Westbrook at milepost 74 on southbound side of turnpike.
Troop E: Montville at milepost 96 on northbound side of turnpike (at former service plaza).
Troop G: Bridgeport at milepost 29 and the junction with Route 8 and Route 25 (on surface road, exit 27, just below interchange).

There is one weigh station located northbound at milepost 2 in Greenwich, at the location of the former toll plaza. Weigh stations on both sides of the turnpike used to exist near exit 18 in Westport; these were removed during the 1990s. The former southbound weigh station in Westport is now used by ConnDOT to store construction materials, while the northbound station was demolished; the grounds returned to their natural state.

The administration building for the former West Haven toll plaza can still be seen by drivers between exits 42 and 43. Today, ConnDOT uses the old toll building as a maintenance facility.

During 2013, electric vehicle (EV) charging for Tesla automobiles was added to the Milford northbound and southbound service plazas in support of Tesla's effort to create a Boston–Washington EV corridor. These locations were the second Supercharger installations on the East Coast; the first was in Newark, Delaware, at the Delaware Turnpike's service plaza. Each of the Milford locations received two Supercharger stalls. Later in 2014, the Darien northbound and southbound service plazas each received four Supercharger stalls. In addition, the southbound Darien service plaza received two chargers for CHAdeMO-equipped EV's.

Exit list
Exits were re-numbered to mile-based numbering on the I-395 and SR 695 portions of the turnpike as part of a sign replacement project in 2015.

See also

References

External links

nycroads.com – Connecticut Turnpike
I-95 (Greater New York Roads)

Former toll roads in Connecticut
Tolled sections of Interstate Highways
State highways in Connecticut
Interstate 95
Transportation in Fairfield County, Connecticut
Transportation in New Haven County, Connecticut
Transportation in Middlesex County, Connecticut
Transportation in New London County, Connecticut
Transportation in Windham County, Connecticut
Freeways in the United States